"Juicy" is a song by American alternative rock group Better Than Ezra. It was released in 2006 as the third single from their album Before the Robots. The song was the follow-up single to 2005's "A Lifetime", which was the band's highest-charting single in four years. It was not as successful, but would reach #13 on the Billboard Adult Top 40 chart.

The song was featured in an episode of America's Funniest Home Videos, in a promotion for Desperate Housewives, and in a Chili's commercial, advertising tasty steaks.

Chart performance

References

2005 songs
2006 singles
Better Than Ezra songs
Songs written by Kevin Griffin
Artemis Records singles